Ypsilanti is a census-designated place and unincorporated community in Stutsman County, North Dakota, United States, and the primary populated place in Ypsilanti Township. A portion of the townsite is located in Corwin Township. Its population was 109 as of the 2020 census.

Demographics

History
In 1879, the U.S. Government gave 621 acres of land to the Northern Pacific Railway, and part of this became Ypsilanti Township and the townsite of Ypsilanti.

The townsite of Ypsilanti was platted by William Hartley Colby and a partner by the name of Lloyd DePuy. W.H. Colby had come from Ypsilanti, Michigan, so he named the new townsite after the Michigan city by that name.

The Ypsilanti Post Office was first established in the Theodore Doughty home, one-half mile north of Ypsilanti, which also served as the Ypsilanti stage coach stop. In 1882, the post office was moved to Ypsilanti proper. At one point, date uncertain, the post office was moved to the Spaulding Store, where it remained until 1921, when it was moved to the Lee Ferguson Store. In June 1953, an addition was built onto the Heffernan house, which served as the post office until September 1, 1967, at which time a stand-alone post office was constructed.

The dam at Ypsilanti Park was constructed in 1931 and 1932, as a W.P.A. Project. Shortly afterward, the park was built alongside the dam. Ed Whitney donated the land where the park is located, while the original park equipment was contributed by Ypsilanti businesses and organizations, and James Crouch built the first two fireplaces at the park. The chief organizers of the park construction were Stan Nicholls, Bob Kotts, and a man named Glaspell.

Climate
This climatic region is typified by large seasonal temperature differences, with warm to hot (and often humid) summers and cold (sometimes severely cold) winters.  According to the Köppen Climate Classification system, Ypsilanti has a humid continental climate, abbreviated "Dfb" on climate maps.

References

External links
 Ypsilanti, North Dakota 58497
 Ypsilanti Schools
 Ypsilanti and community, 1976 from the Digital Horizons website

Census-designated places in Stutsman County, North Dakota
Census-designated places in North Dakota
Unincorporated communities in North Dakota
Unincorporated communities in Stutsman County, North Dakota